Rabbi Abbahu was a Jew and Talmudist of the Talmudic Academies in Syria Palaestina from about 279 to 320 CE and is counted a member of the third generation of Amoraim. He is sometimes cited as Rabbi Abbahu of Kisrin (Caesarea Maritima).

Biography
His rabbinical education was acquired mainly at Tiberias in the academy presided over by Johanan bar Nappaha, with whom his relationship was almost that of a son. He frequently made pilgrimages to Tiberias even after he had become well known as rector of the Caesarean academy.

Abbahu was an authority on weights and measures. He encouraged the study of Koine Greek by Jews. He learned Greek in order to become useful to his people, then under the Roman proconsuls, that language having become, to a considerable extent, the rival of Hebrew even in prayer. In spite of the bitter protests of Shimon bar Abba, he also taught his daughters Greek. Indeed, it was said of Abbahu that he was a living illustration of the biblical maxim: "It is good that you should take hold of this [the study of the Law]; yea, also from that [other branches of knowledge] withdraw not your hand: for he that fears God shall come forth of them all".

Rector in Caesarea
Being wise, handsome, and wealthy, Abbahu became not only popular with his coreligionists, but also influential with the proconsular government. On one occasion, when his senior colleagues, Hiyya bar Abba, Rabbi Ammi, and Rabbi Assi, had punished a certain woman, and feared the wrath of the proconsul, Abbahu was deputed to intercede for them. He had, however, anticipated the rabbis' request, and wrote to them that he had appeased the informers but not the accuser. The witty enigmatic letter describing this incident, preserved in the Talmud, is in the main pure Hebrew, and even includes Hebrew translations of Greek proper names, to avoid the danger of possible exposure should the letter have fallen into the hands of enemies and informers.

After his ordination he declined a teacher's position, recommending in his stead a more needy friend, Abba of Acre, as worthier than himself. He thereby illustrated his own doctrine that it is a divine virtue to sympathise with a friend in his troubles as well as to partake of his joys. Later he assumed the office of rector in Caesarea, the former seat of Hoshaiah Rabbah, and established himself at the so-called Kenishta Maradta (Insurrectionary Synagogue); from which some of the most prominent teachers of the next generation issued. In Caesarea he originated several ritual rules, one of which (regulating the sounding of the shofar) has since been universally adopted, and is referred to by rishonim as "the Enactment of R. Abbahu".

He did not confine his activity to Caesarea, but also visited and taught in many other Jewish towns. On these journeys, Abbahu gathered so many halakhot that scholars turned to him for information on mooted questions. In the course of these travels he made a point of complying with all local enactments, even where such compliance laid him open to the charge of inconsistency. On the other hand, where circumstances required it, he did not spare even the princes of his people. Where, however, the rigorous exposition of laws created hardship for the common people, he did not scruple to modify the decisions of his colleagues for the benefit of the community. As for himself, he was very strict in the observance of the laws. Once he ordered some Samaritan wine, but subsequently heard that the Samaritans no longer strictly observed the dietary laws.  With the assistance of his colleagues (Hiyya bar Abba, Rabbi Ammi, and Rabbi Assi) he investigated the report and, ascertaining it to be well founded, ruled the Samaritans to be equivalent to Gentiles for all ritual purposes.

Abbahu and Hiyya bar Abba
Abbahu's chief characteristic seems to have been modesty. While lecturing in different towns, he met R. Hiyya bar Abba, who was lecturing on intricate halakhic themes. As Abbahu delivered popular sermons, the peopole naturally crowded to hear him, and deserted the halakhist. At this apparent slight, Hiyya manifested chagrin, and Abbahu hastened to comfort him by comparing himself to the peddler of glittering fineries that always attracted the eyes of the masses, while his rival was a trader in precious stones, the virtues and values of which were appreciated only by the connoisseur. This speech not having the desired effect, R. Abbahu showed special respect for his slighted colleague by following him for the remainder of that day. "What," said Abbahu, "is my modesty as compared with that of Abba of Acre, who does not even remonstrate with his interpreter for interpolating his own comments in the lecturer's expositions." When his wife reported to him that his interpreter's wife had boasted of her own husband's greatness, Abbahu simply said, "What difference does it make which of us is really the greater, so long as through both of us heaven is glorified?" His principle of life he expressed in the maxim, "Let man ever be of the persecuted, and not of the persecutors; for there are none among the birds more persecuted than turtle-doves and pigeons, and the Scriptures declare them worthy of the altar."

Later years
Abbahu had two sons, Zeira and Hanina. Some writers ascribe to him a third son, Abimi. Abbahu sent Hanina to the academy at Tiberias, where he had studied, but the youth occupied himself with the burial of the dead, and on hearing of this, the father sent him a reproachful message in this laconic style: "Is it because there are no graves in Caesarea that I have sent you off to Tiberias? Study must precede practice". Abbahu left behind him a number of disciples, the most prominent among whom were the leaders of the 4th amoraic generation, R. Jonah and R. Jose. At Abbahu's death the mourning was so great that it was said "even the statues of Caesarea shed tears".

Against the Christians 
R. Abbahu, although eminent as a halakhist, was more distinguished as an aggadist and controversialist. He had many interesting disputes with the Christians of his day. Sometimes these disputes were of a humorous nature. Thus, a heretic bearing the name of Sason (=Joy) once remarked to him, "In the next world your people will have to draw water for me; for thus it is written in the Bible, 'With joy shall ye draw water.'" To this R. Abbahu replied, "Had the Bible said 'for joy' [le-sason], it would mean as you say, but since it says 'with joy' [be-sason], it means that we shall make bottles of your skin and fill them with water". These controversies, although forced on him, provoked resentment, and it was even related that his physician, Jacob the Schismatic (Minaah), was slowly poisoning him, but Rabbi Ammi and Rabbi Assi discovered the crime in time.

A Christian (Minaah) once asked Abbahu "When does your Messiah come?" in a tone of mockery. Abbahu replied: "When you will be wrapped in darkness, for it says, 'Behold, darkness shall cover the earth, and gross darkness the nations; then shall the Lord rise upon you and His glory shall be seen on you'." A Christian came to Abbahu with the quibbling question: "How could your God in His priestly holiness bury Moses without providing for purificatory rites, yet oceans are declared insufficient?" Abbahu replied: "Does it not say, 'The Lord comes with fire'? Fire is the true element of purification, according to Numbers 31:23." Another question of the same character: "Why the boastful claim, 'What nation on earth is like Your people Israel', since we read, 'All the nations are as nothing before Him'?" Abbahu replied: "Do we not read of Israel, he 'shall not be reckoned among the nations'?"

Abbahu made a notable exception with reference to the Tosefta's statement that the Gilyonim (Gospels) and other books of the heretics (Minnin) are not to be saved from a fire on Shabbat: "the books of those [written by Minnin for the purpose of debating with Jews] at Abidan may or may not be saved." In regard to the line "Barukh Shem Kevod Malkhuto" (Blessed be the Name of His glorious Kingdom) recited after the Shema, Abbahu says that in Palestine, where the Christians look for points of controversy, the words should be recited aloud (lest the Jews be accused of silently tampering with the unity of God proclaimed in the Shema), whereas in the Babylonian city of Nehardea, where there are no Christians, the words are recited with a low voice. Preaching directly against the Christian dogma, Abbahu says: "A king of flesh and blood may have a father, a brother, or a son to share in or dispute his sovereignty, but the Lord says, 'I am the Lord your God! I am the first - that is, I have no father; and I am the last - that is, I have no brother; and besides me there is no God - that is, I have no son'". His comment on Numbers 23:19 has a still more polemical tone: "God is not a man that he should lie; neither the son of man, that he should repent; if a man says: 'I am God,' he is a liar; if he says: 'I am a son of man,' he will have cause to regret it; and if he says, 'I will go up to heaven,' he has said [something] but will not keep his word".

Some of his controversies on Christian theological subjects, as on Adam, on Enoch, and on the resurrection, are less clear and direct.

Other Abbahus 
There are several other Abbahus mentioned in the Talmudim and Midrashim, prominent among whom is Abbahu (Abuha, Aibut) b. Ihi (Ittai), a Babylonian halakhist, contemporary of Samuel and Anan, and brother of Minyamin (Benjamin) bar Ihi. While this Abbahu repeatedly applied to Samuel for information, Samuel in return learned many halakhot from him.

References

 It has the following bibliography:
Grätz, Gesch. d. Juden, 2d ed., iv. 304, 307–317;
 Jost, Gesch. des Judenthums und seiner Sekten, ii.161-164;
 Frankel, Mebo, pp. 58a-60;
 Weiss, Dor, iii. 103–105;
 Bacher, Ag. Pal. Amor. ii. 88–142.

3rd-century births
4th-century deaths
3rd-century rabbis
4th-century rabbis
3rd-century Romans
4th-century Romans
Talmud rabbis of the Land of Israel
Year of birth unknown
Year of death unknown